The 1992 Yorkshire Cup was the eighty-fifth and last occasion on which the  Yorkshire Cup competition had been held. Wakefield Trinity won the trophy by beating Sheffield Eagles by the score of 29-16

Background 
This season there were no junior/amateur clubs taking part, no new entrants but one "leavers", Scarborough Pirates having folded after just one season and a large loss, and so the total of entries decreased by one from  last season, to a total of eighteen.
This in turn resulted in the necessity to continue with a preliminary round to reduce the  number of clubs entering the first round to sixteen.

Competition and results

Preliminary round 
Involved 2 matches and 4 clubs

Round 1 
Involved  8 matches (with no byes) and 16 clubs

Round 2 - Quarter-finals 
Involved 4 matches and 8 clubs

Round 3 – Semi-finals  
Involved 2 matches and 4 clubs

Final 
The match was played at Elland Road,  Leeds, now in West Yorkshire. The attendance was 7,918.

Teams and scorers 

Scoring - Try = four points - Goal = two points - Drop goal = one point

The road to success 
The  following chart excludes any preliminary round fixtures/results

Notes and comments 
1 * The first Yorkshire Cup match played by Castleford Tigers since renaming their stadium The Jungle 
2 * The first Yorkshire Cup match played by Huddersfield since moving into Huddersfield Town's Leeds Road stadium
3 * Dewsbury had moved to Batley's Mount Pleasant while awaiting construction of their new stadium, but played no Yorkshire Cup matches at this temporary venue
4 * Elland Road,  Leeds,  is the home ground of Leeds United A.F.C. with a capacity of 37,914 (The record attendance was 57,892 set on 15 March 1967 for a cup match Leeds v Sunderland). The ground was originally established in 1897 by Holbeck RLFC who played there until their demise after the conclusion of the 1903-04 season

General information for those unfamiliar 
The Rugby League Yorkshire Cup competition was a knock-out competition between (mainly professional) rugby league clubs from  the  county of Yorkshire. The actual area was at times increased to encompass other teams from  outside the  county such as Newcastle, Mansfield, Coventry, and even London (in the form of Acton & Willesden).
The Rugby League season always (until the onset of "Summer Rugby" in 1996) ran from around August-time through to around May-time and this competition always took place early in the season, in the Autumn, with the final taking place in (or just before) December (The only exception to this was when disruption of the fixture list was caused during, and immediately after, the two World Wars)

Postscript 
To date, this was the last season for the Yorkshire (and Lancashire Cup) competitions, which except for the break due to the two World Wars, had taken place annually since its inauguration in the 1905–06 season.
It was fitting that all the  major players, with the  possible exceptions of Keighley Cougars, Bramley, Doncaster and Sheffield Eagles had their name inscribed on the trophy, during the  eighty-five occasions on which the tournament took place, and possible just as well the no "none-Yorkshire" club managed to win the trophy during that period!
It was only after the two county finals had been played that it was announced that both competitions were to be scrapped; news which came as a major surprise and shock to the fans. The reasons given by the ruling body, the Rugby Football League,  were that  it was deemed the cup was adding to fixture congestion for more successful sides and also that a local county cup did not fit the modern image of Rugby League.

Records from the Yorkshire Cup competition

Entrants and number of cup wins 
This table list all the semi-professional clubs which have entered the competition and the number (and dates) of their cup final wins, cup final runner-up spots, and losing semi-final appearances.

See also 
1992–93 Rugby Football League season
Rugby league county cups

References

External links
Saints Heritage Society
1896–97 Northern Rugby Football Union season at wigan.rlfans.com 
Hull&Proud Fixtures & Results 1896/1897
Widnes Vikings - One team, one passion Season In Review - 1896–97
The Northern Union at warringtonwolves.org

RFL Yorkshire Cup
Yorkshire Cup
Yorkshire Cup